The Howmar 12, sometimes written Howmar Twelve, is an American sailing dinghy that was designed by Craig V. Walters of Sparkman & Stephens as a one-design racer, trainer and day sailer and first built in 1983.

Production
The design was Sparkman & Stephens' design #2405. It was built by Howmar Boats Inc.  and its successor company, The New Howmar Boats Corp, in the United States, starting in 1983. A total of 200 boats were completed, but it is now out of production.

Design
The Howmar 12 is a recreational sailboat, built predominantly of fiberglass, with wood trim and foam flotation. It has a fractional sloop with anodized aluminum spars and a loose-footed mainsail, with an adjustable outhaul. The hull features a nearly plumb stem, a vertical transom, a transom-hung rudder controlled by a tiller and a retractable centerboard. Both the centerboard and rudder are made from polyurethane. The boat displaces  and is self-bailing.

The design's sharp prow is intended to cut though waves and the design is capable of planing. It incorporates dry storage in a bow compartment.

Factory options included a boom vang, a hinged mast step, hiking straps and a mount for an outboard motor.

Operational history
In a 1994 review Richard Sherwood wrote, "roomy for its size, the Howmar Twelve is a racer, trainer, and day sailer. The hull’s light weight makes for easy cartopping."

See also
List of sailing boat types

References

External links
Howmar 12 photo
Howmar 12 photo

Dinghies
1980s sailboat type designs
Sailboat type designs by Craig V. Walters
Sailboat types built by Howmar Boats
Sailboat types built by The New Howmar Boats Corp